Arabis caucasica is a species of flowering plant in the mustard family (Brassicaceae) known by the common names garden arabis, mountain rock cress or Caucasian rockcress.

Distribution
It is native to south eastern Europe and the Mediterranean. It is also present in the Madeira Archipelago.

Description
This is an evergreen perennial herb growing to 0.2 m (0 ft 8in) by 1 m (3 ft 3in), flowering in early spring, with white hermaphrodite flowers, pollinated by bees.

Cultivation
It is hardy to zones 4-9 and is not frost tender. A popular ornamental garden plant for its early flowers, cultivars include the pink 'Compinkie'. Under its putative synonym A. alpina subsp. caucasica, the cultivars 'Flore Pleno'  and 'Schneehaube' have gained the Royal Horticultural Society's Award of Garden Merit.

See also 

 List of Arabis species

References

External links
 Plants for a Future
 The Plant List

caucasica
Flora of Europe
Plants described in 1814